Sydney Abram (14 June 1906 – 4 February 1988) was a professional rugby league footballer who played in the 1920s and 1930s.

Background 
Syd Abram was born in Hindley, Wigan, Lancashire, England, and he died aged 81 in Hindley, Wigan, Greater Manchester, England.

Playing career

Challenge Cup Final appearances

County Cup Final appearances
Syd Abram played  in Wigan's 5-4 victory over Widnes in the 1928 Lancashire County Cup Final during the 1928–29 season at Wilderspool Stadium, Warrington on Saturday 24 November 1928.

Playing career
Syd Abram made his début for Wigan, and scored a try in the 35-2 victory over Widnes at Lowerhouse Lane, Widnes on Saturday 23 October 1926, he scored his last try for Wigan in the 3-9 defeat by Widnes at Naughton Park, Widnes on Saturday 26 March 1932, and he played his last match for Wigan in the 5-23 defeat by Salford at Central Park, Wigan on Saturday 27 August 1932.

Genealogical information
Syd Abram's marriage to Eliza Ellen (née Gregory) (birth registered during third ¼ 1909 in Wigan district - 2001 (aged 91)) was registered during third ¼ 1930 in Wigan district, they lived at 9 Burlington Street, Hindley. They had children; William Thomas Abram (birth registered during second ¼ 1931 in Wigan district - 1972 (aged 41)) an engineer, of 44 George Street, Hindley, and Helen R. Abram (birth registered during first ¼ 1936 in Wigan district).

References

External links

Search for "Abram" at rugbyleagueproject.org
Baptism: 1 Jul 1906 St Peter, Hindley, Lancs.

1906 births
1988 deaths
Bramley RLFC captains
Bramley RLFC players
English rugby league players
People from Hindley, Greater Manchester
Rugby league centres
Rugby league five-eighths
Rugby league halfbacks
Rugby league players from Wigan
Wigan Warriors players